Henry of Carinthia may refer to:
Henry III, Duke of Bavaria, also Duke of Carinthia (976–78, 985–89)
Henry II, Duke of Bavaria, also Duke of Carinthia (989–95)
Henry II, Holy Roman Emperor, also Duke of Carinthia (995–1002)
Henry III, Holy Roman Emperor, also Duke of Carinthia (1039–47)
Henry of Eppenstein, Duke of Carinthia (1090–1122)
Henry IV, Duke of Carinthia (1122–23)
Henry V, Duke of Carinthia (1144–61)
Henry of Bohemia, also Duke of Carinthia (1310–35)